Massaria is a genus of fungi in the family Massariaceae.

The genus name of Massaria is in honour of Giuseppe Filippo Massara (1792-1839), who was an Italian doctor and botanist, working in Sondrio.

The genus was circumscribed by Giuseppe De Notaris in Giorn. Bot. Ital. vol.1 (Issue 1) on page 333 in 1844.

Known species
As accepted by GBIF;

References

External links
Index Fungorum

Pleosporales
Taxa named by Giuseppe De Notaris